Leah Siegel is an American singer-songwriter and musician performing under the name Firehorse.

Siegel wrote a song in a commercial for Topsy Foundation, which promotes early childhood development in the Mpumalanga province of South Africa. The commercial won a Clio Award, Grand LIA and award at Cannes, in addition to being named an "ad worth spreading" by the nonprofit group TED Conference. The 90-second clip was shown in its entirety in the It's not all doom and gloom section of Russell Howard's Good News on BBC2 in 2010.

Her musical influences are (in no particular order) Joni Mitchell, Judy Garland, Doris Day, Nina Simone and Janis Joplin.

Siegel co-wrote the theme for Haven with Andre Fratto.

Siegel's latest album is under the alias Firehorse and contains the completed version of the song If You Don't Want To Be Alone used in the Topsy Foundation commercial.

Siegel is involved in a number of side projects: she fronts the vintage soul/R&B outfit Brooklyn Boogaloo Blowout, sings in the Citizens Band, a cabaret collective featuring musicians from the group Beirut, and in Leisure Cruise with former Broken Social Scene member Dave Hodge. She has a clothing line in the works.

Leah Siegel is the daughter of Robert Siegel and Jane Siegel.

Discography
As Firehorse

2013 Pills From Strangers Original Release Date: June, 2013, Label: Pledgemusic
Bloodstream
Good
Wave
Any Other Day
Scarecrow
Walls
Fool
Credits Produced by Geoff Stanfield 
All songs by Leah Siegel

2011 And so they ran faster... Original Release Date: September 27, 2011, Label: Pledgemusic
She's A River
Our Hearts
Only The Birds
Young
Machete Gang Holiday
If You Don't Want To Be Alone
Puppet
My Left Eye
Baby Bird
Credits Produced by Geoff Stanfield (Mark Kozelek, Sun Kil Moon, Moby) and with Steve Elliot on guitar, the Tim Luntzel (Rosanne Cash, Loudon Wainwright III, and more) on bass, and Brian Wolfe (Sharon Jones & The Dap-Kings, Diane Schuur, Joan Jett, and others) on drums.
All songs by Leah Siegel

As Leah Siegel

2004 Leah Siegel Presents, Original Release Date: January 1, 2004, Label: Leah Siegel
Walking in Circles
Shadow
Red Shoes
The Grandma Song
I Found a Reason*
How Do You Take It
The Early Morning Hour
Credits Karl Meyer Violin, Marc Dieter Einstmann Mastering, Jeff Hudgins Clarinet, Sax (Alto), Producer, Drum Arrangements, String Arrangements, Triangle, Glockenspiel, Leah Siegel Guitar, Composer, Vocals, Drum Arrangements, Producer, David Sharpe Cello
All songs by Leah Siegel except * Lou Reed

2005 The Lemon (EP), Original Release Date: June 13, 2005, Label: Leah Siegel
Lemon	
The Motorcycle Song
Pinned Down

2006 Little Mule, Original Release Date: December 8, 2006, Label: Walk Don't Run Records
A Day At the River (With You and Your Lover)
The Water
The Grandma Song	
Sea Dragon
Lemon
A Trail of Peach Pits
My Heart Is a Graveyard	
Pin Down
The Motorcycle Song
Black Tile Room*
Raincloud	
The Pond Was Dry**
Credits Sam Hofstedt Engineer, Mixing, Geoff Stanfield Bass, Composer, Engineer, Mixing, Producer, Chris Tarry Bass, Handclapping, Composer, Brian Wolfe Percussion, Composer, Drums, Handclapping, Vibraphone, Leah Siegel Guitar (Acoustic), Handclapping, Composer, Guitar (Electric), Vocals, Adam Kasper Mixing, Bob Ludwig Mastering
All songs by Leah Siegel except *Steve Elliot, Chris Tarry, Leah Siegel, Geoff Stanfield & Brian Wolfe, **Leah Siegel and Geoff Stanfield

References

External links

 
 The Topsy Foundation
 Los Angeles Times Music Blog

1979 births
American rock songwriters
American rock singers
Singers from New York City
American rock guitarists
Alternative rock groups from New York (state)
Living people
Musicians from Brooklyn
Guitarists from New York City
21st-century American singers
21st-century American guitarists
Singer-songwriters from New York (state)